Bolesław Biegas (1877–1954) was a Polish, surrealist and Symbolist painter and sculptor.

Biegas was born in Koziczyn, Poland and orphaned at a young age.  He began studying sculpture in Warsaw in the studio of a local sculptor, Antoni Panasiuk, then studied art under Konstanty Laszczka at the Jan Matejko Academy of Fine Arts in Krakow.  After being expelled for his sculpture The Book of Life, Biegas moved permanently to Paris, where he briefly attended the École des Beaux-Arts before beginning his independent artistic activity.

From 1900, his works were exhibited in several Salons, including the parisian Galerie des Artistes Modernes and Galerie Arts et Artistes Anglais, and galleries in London, St. Petersburg and Kiev.

Biegas also created a series of Symbolist style paintings, featuring mythical, monstrous and female chimeras, which symbolised a violent battle of the sexes.

Biegas established a small museum for his art in 1950, in Paris, France, called the Musée Boleslas Biegas. It is located within the Polish Library in Paris in the 4th arrondissement of Paris at 6, Quai d'Orléans.

The museum contains his own paintings and sculpture, as well as other Polish artists active from the end of the nineteenth century to the beginning of the twentieth century, including Olga Boznańska and Tadeusz Makowski. The museum occupies one room in the Polish Library in Paris, which also houses the Musée Adam Mickiewicz and the Salon Frédéric Chopin. Guided visits are available Thursday afternoons and Saturday mornings by prior appointment; an admission fee is charged.

See also 
 List of museums in Paris
 Symbolists
 Fin-de-siecle

References 
 Bibliothèque Polonaise de Paris
 Paris.org description
 Paris Visites, Petit Futé, 2007, page 27. .
 Boston College, Boleslas Biegas sculptures

Specific

External links
 Boleslaw Biegas www.biegas.pl
 

1877 births
1954 deaths
People from Ciechanów County
19th-century Polish painters
19th-century Polish male artists
20th-century Polish painters
20th-century Polish male artists
Polish male painters